Steingeliidae is a family of scales and mealybugs in the order Hemiptera. There are about 5 genera and 10 described species in Steingeliidae.

Genera
These five genera belong to the family Steingeliidae:
 Araucaricoccus Brimblecombe, 1960
 Conifericoccus Brimblecombe, 1960
 Steingelia Nasonov, 1908
 Stomacoccus Ferris, 1917
 † Palaeosteingelia Koteja & Azar, 2008

References

Further reading

 

Scale insects
Hemiptera families